Slaviša Gačić (born 20 December 1986 in Teslić, SR Bosnia and Herzegovina) is a Bosnian Serb professional football defender who played for FK Proleter Teslić in the First League of the Republika Srpska.

Career
 Proleter Teslić 2003-2011
 FK Budućnost Banja Luka 2011-2013
 FK Džaja Banja Luka 2013-2014
 FK Sloga Trn 2014

References

External links
Picture

1986 births
Living people
People from Teslić
Association football central defenders
Bosnia and Herzegovina footballers
FK Proleter Teslić players
First League of the Republika Srpska players
Bosnia and Herzegovina expatriate footballers